"Touch" is a song by British record producer and DJ Shift K3Y. The song was released in the United Kingdom on 13 April 2014 as a digital download. The song peaked at number 3 on the UK Singles Chart. It was written and produced by Shift K3Y.

Music video
A music video to accompany the release of "Touch" was first released onto YouTube on 3 March 2014 at a total length of two minutes and fifty-nine seconds.

Track listing

Chart performance
On 16 April 2014 the song was at number 3 on The Official Chart Update in the UK. On 20 April 2014 the song entered the UK Singles Chart at number three, making it his first UK top 5 single.

Charts and certifications

Charts

Certifications

Release history

References

2014 singles
Shift K3Y songs
UK garage songs
2013 songs
Sony Music singles
Songs written by Shift K3Y